Tripković is a Serbian surname.

At least 134 individuals with the surname died at the Jasenovac concentration camp.

It may refer to:

Uroš Tripković (born 1986), Serbian professional basketball player
Stefan Tripković (footballer, born 1993), Serbian football striker
Stefan Tripković (footballer, born 1994), Serbian football midfielder
Yves-Alexandre Tripkovic (born 1972), French-Croatian writer, stage director and translator 
Zlatko Tripković, Yugoslavian football midfielder

See also
Trifković, a surname

References

Serbian surnames
Croatian surnames